Laurits is a masculine given name, a Danish and Estonian variant of the Scandinavian Lauritz, related to the English names Laurence and Lawrence. It may refer to:

Laurits, fire god related to St. Lawrence in Estonian mythology

Given name
 Hans Laurits Olsen Hammerstad (1840after 1877), Norwegian politician
 Laurits Grønland (18871957), Norwegian politician
 Laurits Jørgensen (1896after 1920), Danish track and field athlete who competed in the 1920 Summer Olympics
 Laurits Larsen (18721949), Danish sport shooter who competed in the 1912 and 1920 Summer Olympics
  (born 1960), Estonian astronomer, director of Tartu Observatory
 Laurits Munch-Petersen (born 1973), Danish film director
 Laurits Andersen Ring (18541933), Danish painter known as L. A. Ring
 Laurits Clausen Scabo (15621626), Lutheran Bishop of Stavanger 160526
 Laurits S. Swenson (18651947), American diplomat
 Laurits Tørnæs (born 1936), Danish politician
 Laurits Tuxen (18531927), Danish painter and sculptor
 Niels Laurits Høyen (17981870), Danish art historian and critic

Surname
Peeter Laurits (born 1962), Estonian artist
Taavi Laurits (born 1990), Estonian footballer (:et)

See also 
 Lauritz (disambiguation)
 

Danish masculine given names
Estonian masculine given names
Estonian-language surnames